Jody Knowles (born March 3, 1986) is an American professional stock car racing driver. A late model racer, he has competed in the NASCAR Camping World Truck Series.

Racing career
Knowles started in quarter midget racing at five years of age, and began dirt track racing on a permanent basis when he was 13 years old.

In 2014, Knowles competed in the NASCAR Camping World Truck Series' Mudsummer Classic at Eldora Speedway. He ran in the top 15 for much of the final race before suffering a pass-through penalty for being out of position on a restart. He was also involved in a late spin that brought out a caution, and would finish 28th.

Personal life
His father Jerry formerly competed in the NASCAR Sportsman Division. Cousin Tony is also a Super Late Model racer.

Motorsports career results

NASCAR
(key) (Bold – Pole position awarded by qualifying time. Italics – Pole position earned by points standings or practice time. * – Most laps led.)

Camping World Truck Series

References

External links
 

1986 births
NASCAR drivers
Living people
Racing drivers from Atlanta
Racing drivers from Georgia (U.S. state)
People from Tyrone, Georgia
Sportspeople from the Atlanta metropolitan area